The Kerala State Film Award for Best Children's Film winners:

References

Official website
PRD, Govt. of Kerala: Awardees List

Kerala State Film Awards